Man at the Top may refer to:

 Man at the Top (TV series), a 1970s British drama series
 Man at the Top (film), a 1973 film spun off from the TV series
 "Man at the Top" (song), a song by Bruce Springsteen